"Tomorrow" is a song co-written and recorded by American country music singer Chris Young.  It was released in February 2011 as the seventh single of his career and the first from his 2011 album Neon. The song sold 30,000 digital downloads in its first week of release.  Young wrote this song with Anthony L. Smith and Frank J. Myers.

Background and writing
Young told Taste of Country that Frank J. Myers came into the writing session with the idea. "He was like, 'I was thinking about this at the gym,' and he played us like the first half of the verse." Young went on to say that all of the writers agreed that this was probably one of the best things any of them had ever written.

Critical reception
Blake Boldt of Engine 145 gave the song a "thumbs up", saying that it "might be the most traditional song you hear on country radio in 2011." Amy Sciarretto of Taste of Country called it "a tender, lovelorn ballad that tugs unmercifully at your heart strings." Giving it four stars out of five, Matt Bjorke of Roughstock praised the production and Young's "pliable" singing. In 2017, Billboard contributor Chuck Dauphin put "Tomorrow" at number nine on his top 10 list of Young's best songs.

Music video
Young confirmed with GAC that he filmed a music video, which was directed by Trey Fanjoy. The video premiered on CMT on April 26, 2011. It was his last video to feature him in a cowboy hat.

Chart performance

"Tomorrow" debuted on the U.S. Billboard Hot Country Songs chart for the week of April 2, 2011, and it debuted at number 96 on the U.S. Billboard Hot 100 chart for the week of April 2, 2011. On the chart dated August 6, 2011, "Tomorrow" became Young's fourth consecutive Number One single.

Weekly charts

Year-end charts

Decade-end charts

Certifications

References

2011 singles
Chris Young (musician) songs
Songs written by Frank J. Myers
Songs written by Anthony L. Smith
Song recordings produced by James Stroud
RCA Records Nashville singles
Music videos directed by Trey Fanjoy
2011 songs
Songs written by Chris Young (musician)
Country ballads
2010s ballads